The Bombardment of Casablanca was a French naval attack taking place from August 5 to 7 in 1907 that destroyed the Moroccan city of Casablanca. France used mainly artillery fire from battleships to bomb the city and targets in the surrounding area, which caused an estimated 1,500 to 7,000 Moroccan deaths. The bombardment of Casablanca opened a western front to the French conquest of Morocco after Hubert Lyautey's occupation of Oujda in the east earlier that year.

The bombardment came after an attack of tribesmen of the Shawiya opposed to the terms of the Treaty of Algeciras of 1906 to the French presence in the customs house and to the construction of a railroad over a sanctuary, specifically on European employees of the Compagnie Marocaine operating a Decauville train from a quarry in Roches Noires to the Port of Casablanca on July 30, 1907. When the French cruiser Galilée disembarked a landing party of 75 soldiers on August 5, an insurrection broke out in the city.

The Galilée and the Du Chayla bombarded the city with mélinite, an explosive substance containing picric acid that struck residential neighborhouods, particularly the Tnaker.

Background 
After capturing Oujda, French forces turned their sights to Casablanca, the domain of the tribes of the Chaouia that were known for producing soldiers.

Five years before the French protectorate, Casablanca had been occupied, but the battles continued. Dozens of battles took place within the city, in the periphery and finally deeper into the Chaouia.

In 1907, the issue of French agents controlling customs duties and the start of intense, alienating and clearly-colonial construction came to a head.

On July 29, a delegation of Chaouia tribes presented itself to Moulay Lamine, the governor of the province and uncle of Morocco's young sultan, Abdelaziz El-Alawi, with the desire to demolish the works under way. Another delegation met with the city's pasha, Si Boubker Ben Bouzid Slaoui to protest and demand an end to the construction on the port, the destruction of the railroad and the removal of the French supervisors at the customs house. On July 30, the turmoil in the city increased. In the morning, a public crier sent by the Oulad Hriz tribe called the population to end all relations with the French.

, the qa'id of the Oulad Hriz tribe, called for jihad and prepared for battle with the French and the Spanish and their associates. People of the Chaouia took to the streets and violence broke out that afternoon, which led leading to the death of nine European labourers working for the Compagnie Marocaine, the French company that was chosen to build the port. The protesters stopped the train, the tracks of which ran over the Sidi Belyout necropolis on the way to a quarry up the shore with a pile of rocks on the track, and attacked the European workers aboard: four French, three Italian and two Spanish.

Bombardment 
After the insurrection of July 30, 1907, thousands of warriors from the Chaouia, apparently allied with Ma al-'Aynayn, took Casablanca. France was surprised because of poor intelligence and urgently sent for a fleet, which left from Algeria. The morning of August 5, 66 men disembarked from Galilée to protect the French consulate, a move that was criticised by other European powers present in Casablanca, as it aggravated the situation in the city. Foreign warships arrived on the scene, including the British cruiser  and the Spanish gunboat , which landed 30 men to protect the Spanish consulate.

The French protected cruiser  arrived from the Azores. In the late afternoon, once French forces had occupied the French, Swedish and Portuguese consulates in Casablanca by entering through the Portuguese consulate, Galilée commenced bombardment.

Galilée and Gloire bombarded the qasbah causing numerous casualties: "rebels" and civilians alike. The working-class neighborhood Tnaker (تناكر), near the port, paid the heftiest price by taking shrapnel from shells filled with mélinite, a nitric compound that was adopted by the French government. Houses of worship, including the great mosque and the sanctuary of the Mausoleum of Allal al-Qairawani, were not spared.

The gates to the medina were especially targeted to prevent the entrance of Chaoui combatants.

The bombardment continued through the night and into the morning of August 6, with 31 soldiers disembarking from Du Chayla and 44 from Forbin. The Moroccans, despite the considerable losses suffered from the incessant bombardment, continued to fight, which inspired unease within the French troops. The squadron of Rear-Admiral Joseph-Alphonse Philibert brought General Antoine Drude's troops, including French and Algerian tirailleurs, to shore at the beach of Sidi Belyout, where they were met with Moroccan fire.

On August 7, the disembarked troops of General Drude and the marine riflemen of Philibert, after fierce combat, retook control of the city. According to eyewitnesses and diplomatic sources, a "revolution" seemed to have started in Morocco. Some had the premonition that was only the beginning of a long war between the French and the Moroccans.

Over three days of bombs raining down from the French warships, followed by carnage and pillaging from troops on the ground, what had been a prosperous city of 30,000 inhabitants was transformed into a field of rubble with nothing spared except for the European neighbourhood.

French sources put the death toll at a conservative 600 to 1,500, but German sources estimate 2,000 to 3,000. Moroccan sources, supported by European testimonies, attest that only a few rare inhabitants of the city survived after the carnage.

On September 6, the commercial ship Magnus brought the 400 Jews who had fled at the beginning of the insurrection back to Casablanca from Tangier and Gibraltar.

Gallery

See also
Bombardment of Alexandria
Bombardment of Algiers (disambiguation)

References 

Bombing
1900s in Morocco
Insurgencies
Sieges involving France
Invasions by France
European colonisation in Africa
French colonisation in Africa
1907 in Africa
1907 in France
20th century in Casablanca
Massacres in Morocco
Casablanca